"Atlantis" is a rock music instrumental by British group the Shadows, released as a single in May 1963. It spent 17 weeks on the UK Singles Chart, peaking at number two for two weeks.

Background and reception
"Atlantis" was written by Jerry Lordan, who had previously written two chart-topping songs for the Shadows, "Apache" and "Wonderful Land". It was released with the B-side "I Want You to Want Me", written by Hank Marvin. Whilst the Shadows had included vocals on some of their album tracks, "I Want You to Want Me" was the first single by the Shadows to feature vocals since "Saturday Dance", released as the B-side to "Lonesome Fella" in 1959. "Atlantis" was recorded on 13 December 1962 at EMI Studios in London; "I Want You to Want Me", on the other hand, was recorded on 1 May 1963 whilst the group were in Barcelona. The Shadows came up with the title "Atlantis" whilst on a bus in Barcelona, saying it was "a follow-on to the Telstar, Polaris idea".

Reviewed in New Record Mirror, "Atlantis" was described as having "a medium tempo beat with some strings in the background. Rather like all the rest of their stuff but still with a lot of commercial appeal. There's also a femme chorus on the backing. Nice stuff for the younger teens". Reviewing for Disc, Don Nicholl described it as an "attractive Latin beat instrumental" and "a deceptive little item – by no means so simple as it sounds".

Track listing
7": Columbia / DB 7047
 "Atlantis" – 2:47
 "I Want You to Want Me" – 2:34

Personnel
 Hank Marvin – electric lead guitar
 Bruce Welch – acoustic rhythm guitar
 Brian "Licorice" Locking – electric bass guitar
 Brian Bennett – drums, triangle
 Norrie Paramor Strings – all other instrumentation

Charts

References

Songs about Atlantis
1963 singles
The Shadows songs
Songs written by Jerry Lordan
Rock instrumentals
1963 songs
Columbia Graphophone Company singles
1960s instrumentals
Song recordings produced by Norrie Paramor